V. P. Duraisamy is an Indian politician of the Bharatiya Janata Party and a former member of Tamil Nadu Legislative Assembly.

Political career
He served as the Deputy Speaker of the Tamil Nadu Legislative Assembly from 1989 to 1991 and 2006 to 2011. He was a member of Rajya Sabha from 1995 to 2001 and also chairman of many legislature committees. He was expelled from the post of Deputy general secretary of DMK on 21 May 2020 following which he joined BJP.

Personal life 
Duraisamy is born to a Dalit family to Perumal.

References

Living people
Bharatiya Janata Party politicians from Tamil Nadu
Year of birth missing (living people)
Place of birth missing (living people)
Missing middle or first names
Deputy Speakers of the Tamil Nadu Legislative Assembly
Rajya Sabha members from Tamil Nadu
Dravida Munnetra Kazhagam politicians
Tamil Nadu MLAs 2006–2011